The National Disaster Management Authority (abbreviated as NDMA), is an autonomous and constitutionally established federal authority mandated to deal with the whole spectrum of disasters and their management in the country.

The NDMA formulates and enforces national disaster policies at federal and provisional levels and collaborates closely with various government ministries, military forces, and United Nations-based organizations to jointly coordinate efforts to conduct its disaster management, search and rescue, and wide range of humanitarian operations in the country and abroad. The NDMA aims to develop sustainable operational capacity and professional competence to undertake its humanitarian operations at its full capacity.

Legislative history 
 National Disaster Management Ordinance, 2006 
 National Disaster Management Act, 2010

Operational scope and constitutional definition
The functions and duties are defined and set by the Constitution of Pakistan in Article 239I in Chapter1. The Commission charged with the following duties:

 To act as the implementing, coordinating and monitoring body for disaster management;
 To prepare the National Plan to be approved and implement, coordinate and monitor the implementation of the National policy;
 To provide necessary technical assistance to the Provincial Governments and the Provincial Authorities for preparing their disaster management plans in accordance with the guidelines laid down by the National Commission;
To coordinate response in the event of any threatening disaster situation or disaster

Chairman 
Codified under the Article 89(1) of the Constitution of Pakistan, the institution is chaired by the appointed chairman, either civilian or military officer, and directly reports to the Prime Minister of Pakistan as its chief operations coordinator. As of present, the institution is currently chaired by Lieutenant General Akhtar Nawaz Satti of Pakistan Army as its appointed chairman.

Nepal earthquake relief controversy 
The National Disaster Management Authority of Pakistan sent aid and personnel to Nepal after the April 2015 Nepal earthquake. Four Lockheed C-130 planes with a 30-bed hospital, 2,000 military meals, 600 blankets, 200 tents, and other assorted relief items. Military emergency personnel including army doctors, medical staff and National Disaster Management Authority of Pakistan's special search and rescue teams with sniffer dogs. The supplies sent by Pakistan .

See also
 Federal Flood Commission
 Earthquake Reconstruction & Rehabilitation Authority
 National Disaster Management Act, 2010
 National Command and Operation Center (NCOC)
Provincial authorities
 Provincial Disaster Management Authority (Khyber Pakhtunkhwa)
 Provincial Disaster Management Authority (Balochistan)
 Gilgit Baltistan Disaster Management Authority

References

External links
NDMA official site

National disaster management commission

Emergency management in Pakistan
Flood control in Asia
2007 establishments in Pakistan
Pakistan federal departments and agencies
Government agencies established in 2007